The Integrated Media Systems Center (IMSC) is on the campus of the University of Southern California, United States. It was founded using a grant from the US National Science Foundation in 1996 for the study of Integrated Media Systems.
The original mission was focused on the advancement the integration of digital video, immersive audio, text, animation and graphics to  transform the way people work, communicate, learn, teach, entertain and play. By using cross-disciplinary programs of research and education, the Center has taken multimedia to a new level of technological sophistication.

References

External links 
 
 More information on IMSC

1996 establishments in California
Centers of the University of Southern California
Research institutes in California
Information technology research institutes
Digital media schools